The 2018–19 Korisliiga season was the 79th season of the top professional basketball league in Finland. Karhu successfully defended their title to repeat as Finnish national champions.

Format
The eleven teams played four times against each one of the other teams for a total of 40 games. The eight best qualified teams joined the playoffs and the last one played a best-of-three relegation playoff against the First Division runners-up.

Teams

Ura promoted from First Division and Kobrat remained in the league as Espoo United was expelled due to financial irregularities.

Regular season

League table

Results

Playoffs
The quarter-finals and semi-finals were played in a best-of-three 1–1–1–1–1 format with re-seeding in the semifinals. The finals were played in a best-of-seven playoff format.

Bracket

Quarterfinals

|}

Semifinals

|}

Third place game

|}

Final

|}

Relegation playoffs

|}

Finnish clubs in European competitions

References

External links
Official website

Korisliiga seasons
Finnish
Koris